North Valley Stream is a hamlet and census-designated place (CDP) in the Town of Hempstead in Nassau County, on Long Island, in New York, United States. The population was 16,628 at the 2010 census.

History 
North Valley Stream's name reflects its location north of the Incorporated Village of Valley Stream.

In the 1950s, the Southern State Parkway was widened from four lanes to six in the hamlet. The project required roughly 213 North Valley Stream area homes located along the path to be moved or demolished.

Geography

Demographics

As of the census of 2000, there were 15,789 people, 4,860 households, and 3,946 families residing in the CDP. The population density was 8,382.9 per square mile (3,242.6/km2). There were 4,951 housing units at an average density of 2,628.7/sq mi (1,016.8/km2). The racial makeup of the CDP was 44.73% White, 37.08% African American, 0.27% Native American, 9.03% Asian, 0.06% Pacific Islander, 4.69% from other races, and 4.14% from two or more races. Hispanic or Latino of any race were 10.82% of the population.

There were 4,860 households, out of which 39.6% had children under the age of 18 living with them, 61.9% were married couples living together, 14.9% had a female householder with no husband present, and 18.8% were non-families. 16.1% of all households were made up of individuals, and 8.5% had someone living alone who was 65 years of age or older. The average household size was 3.21 and the average family size was 3.57.

In the CDP, the population was spread out, with 26.0% under the age of 18, 8.3% from 18 to 24, 28.6% from 25 to 44, 23.0% from 45 to 64, and 14.0% who were 65 years of age or older. The median age was 37 years. For every 100 females, there were 86.7 males. For every 100 females age 18 and over, there were 84.2 males.

The median income for a household in the CDP was $82,100, and the median income for a family was $88,914. Males had a median income of $83,450 versus $57,015 for females. The per capita income for the CDP was $24,727. About 3.0% of families and 3.7% of the population were below the poverty line, including 2.7% of those under age 18 and 6.5% of those age 65 or over.

Parks and recreation 
Valley Stream State Park is primarily located within the hamlet, while a small portion extends south into the Village of Valley Stream.

Education

Elementary 
North Valley Stream is located within the boundaries of (and is thus served by) three elementary school districts: the Elmont, Valley Stream 13, and Valley Stream 30 Union Free School Districts. As such, children who reside within North Valley Stream and attend public elementary schools go the school in one of these three districts depending on where they reside within the hamlet.

Secondary 
North Valley Stream is located within the boundaries of (and is thus served by) the Valley Stream Central High School District and the Sewanhaka Central High School District. As such, children who reside within North Valley Stream and attend public high schools either attend the Valley Stream CHSD's high schools or the Sewanhaka CHSD's high schools, depending on where they reside within the hamlet.

Additionally, the Elmont UFSD feeds into the Sewanhaka CHSD, while the Valley Stream 13 UFSD and Valley Stream 30 UFSD both feed into the Valley Stream CHSD.

Transportation

Road 
The Southern State Parkway travels through and serves North Valley Stream. The Southern State Parkway meanders its way west-to-east within the hamlet, roughly bisecting the hamlet in half.

Other major roads in North Valley Stream include Central Avenue, Corona Avenue, Dutch Broadway, Fletcher Avenue, and Linden Boulevard.

Rail 
No rail services pass through North Valley Stream. The nearest Long Island Rail Road stations to the hamlet are Valley Stream on the Atlantic Branch and Westwood, and Malverne on the West Hempstead Branch.

Bus 
The hamlet is served by the n1, n2, n3, n8, and n25 bus routes, which are operated by Nassau Inter-County Express (NICE).

See also 

 Valley Stream, New York
 South Valley Stream, New York

References

Valley Stream, New York
Census-designated places in New York (state)
Census-designated places in Nassau County, New York